Charles Gilpin may refer to:

 Charles Gilpin (politician) (1815–1874), British politician, MP for Northampton
 Charles Gilpin (mayor), mayor of Philadelphia 1850–1854
 Charles Sidney Gilpin (1878–1930), American actor

See also 
 Gilpin (disambiguation)